The Pre-Olympic qualification event in curling was held from October 5–15, 2021, in Erzurum, Turkey. It was the last chance for National Olympic Committees to qualify for the Olympic qualification event. For mixed doubles three nations qualified for the Olympic qualification event. For the other two disciplines, men's and women's, two nations qualified for the Olympic qualification event. Latvia, Turkey and Denmark qualified in the mixed doubles; the  Czech Republic and Finland qualified in men's; and Latvia and Turkey qualified in the women's.

Mixed doubles

Teams

Round-robin standings
Final round-robin standings

Round-robin results
All draw times are listed in Turkey Time (UTC+03:00).

Draw 1
Tuesday, October 5, 9:00

Draw 2
Tuesday, October 5, 14:00

Draw 3
Tuesday, October 5, 19:00

Draw 4
Wednesday, October 6, 9:00

Draw 5
Wednesday, October 6, 14:00

Draw 6
Wednesday, October 6, 19:00

Draw 7
Thursday, October 7, 9:00

Draw 8
Thursday, October 7, 14:00

Draw 9
Thursday, October 7, 19:00

The team from  ran out of time in the eighth end, and therefore forfeited the game.

Playoffs

Qualification Semifinal Game 1
Friday, October 8, 9:00

Qualification Semifinal Game 2
Friday, October 8, 9:00

Qualification Semifinal Game 3
Friday, October 8, 9:00

Qualification Game 1
Friday, October 8, 15:00

Qualification Game 2
Friday, October 8, 15:00

Qualification Game 3
Friday, October 8, 15:00

Men

Teams

Round-robin standings
Final round-robin standings

Round-robin results
All draw times are listed in Turkey Time (UTC+03:00).

Draw 1
Sunday, October 10, 14:00

Draw 2
Sunday, October 10, 19:00

Draw 3
Monday, October 11, 9:00

Draw 4
Monday, October 11, 14:00

Draw 5
Monday, October 11, 19:00

Draw 6
Tuesday, October 12, 9:00

Draw 7
Tuesday, October 12, 14:00

Draw 8
Tuesday, October 12, 19:00

Draw 9
Wednesday, October 13, 9:00

Draw 11
Wednesday, October 13, 19:00

Draw 12
Thursday, October 14, 9:00

Draw 13
Thursday, October 14, 14:00

Draw 14
Thursday, October 14, 19:00

Playoffs

Qualification Semifinal 1
Friday, October 15, 9:00

Qualification Semifinal 2
Friday, October 15, 9:00

Qualification Game 1
Friday, October 15, 16:00

Qualification Game 2
Friday, October 15, 16:00

Women

Teams

Round-robin standings
Final round-robin standings

Round-robin results
All draw times are listed in Turkey Time (UTC+03:00).

Draw 3
Monday, October 11, 9:00

Draw 4
Monday, October 11, 14:00

Draw 5
Monday, October 11, 19:00

Draw 6
Tuesday, October 12, 9:00

Draw 7
Tuesday, October 12, 14:00

Draw 8
Tuesday, October 12, 19:00

Draw 9
Wednesday, October 13, 9:00

Draw 10
Wednesday, October 13, 14:00

Draw 12
Thursday, October 14, 9:00

Draw 14
Thursday, October 14, 19:00

Playoffs

Qualification Game 1
Friday, October 15, 9:00

Second Place Game
Friday, October 15, 9:00

Qualification Game 2
Friday, October 15, 16:00

References

2021 in Turkish sport
Sport in Erzurum
Qualification for the 2022 Winter Olympics
October 2021 sports events in Turkey
2021 in curling
International curling competitions hosted by Turkey